Valeria Vasilievna Lyulyaeva (born 28 June 1941) is a retired Russian rower who won a European title in the coxed four in 1966.

References

1946 births
Living people
Russian female rowers
Soviet female rowers
European Rowing Championships medalists